Yuppiechef is an online retailer of kitchen and homeware products founded in 2006 by Andrew Smith and Shane Dryden in Cape Town, South Africa.

Originally run from Andrew Smith’s home, Yuppiechef was one of a few experimental e-commerce projects initiated by co-founders Andrew Smith and Shane Dryden who were running a web development agency at the time. Initially, the first Yuppiechef deliveries were packed and shipped from Smith's lounge.

In 2010, Yuppiechef gained significant media attention through guerrilla marketing that made use of a national marketing campaign by retailer Woolworths called ‘Woolies Lovebirds’. A misspelled URL on Woolworth’s marketing material, allowed them to register the URL, and post a ransom note asking that Woolworths match any donations by Yuppiechef’s customers to a local charity they supported at the time.

Known for their hand written cards and fanatical customer following, Yuppiechef is considered one of the pioneers of e-commerce in South Africa, and has independently been awarded the accolade of best eCommerce store in South Africa from 2010 - 2015. Twelve years after starting its online store, Yuppiechef opened its first brick & mortar stores in Cape Town and Johannesburg. In October 2017, the first of their physical retail stores was launched in South Africa at Willowbridge Shopping Centre. They have subsequently opened two more stores at the V&A Waterfront, and Gardens Shopping Centre, both in Cape Town. Yuppiechef is now headquartered in Westlake Business Park, from where they also operate a store.

See also
E-commerce
Online shopping
Omnichannel

References

2006 establishments in South Africa
Online retailers of South Africa
Companies based in Cape Town